Micael Davide Macedo Babo (born 5 June 1993 in Freixo de Cima, Amarante) is a Portuguese footballer who plays for Amarante F.C. as a midfielder.

References

External links

1993 births
Living people
People from Amarante, Portugal
Sportspeople from Porto District
Portuguese footballers
Association football midfielders
Liga Portugal 2 players
Segunda Divisão players
S.C. Freamunde players
C.F. União players
C.D. Trofense players
U.D. Oliveirense players
Amarante F.C. players
Portugal youth international footballers